Jesús Ángel Solana Bermejo (born 25 December 1964) is a Spanish former professional footballer. A defender, he was equally at ease as a left-back or a central defender.

He played 361 La Liga games over the course of 15 seasons, representing Real Madrid (six years) and Zaragoza (nine).

Club career
Born in Arnedo, La Rioja, Solana was a product of Real Madrid's youth academy. He was used regularly in five of his six seasons with the capital club's first team, as they won five La Liga titles in a row.

However, Solana would be most known for his spell at Real Zaragoza, where he added one Copa del Rey to his trophy cabinet as well as the memorable 1994–95 edition of the UEFA Cup Winners' Cup against Arsenal, appearing in more than 300 overall official matches for the Aragonese. Having retired in 2000 at nearly 36, he had a three-year coaching spell with the side's reserves, then returned late into the 2012–13 campaign to prevent relegation from Segunda División B, which eventually did not happen.

International career
Solana won one cap for Spain, coming on as a substitute for Quique Sánchez Flores – who would later be his teammate at Zaragoza – in the 83rd minute of a 1990 FIFA World Cup qualifier against the Republic of Ireland, on 16 November 1988.

Honours
Real Madrid
La Liga: 1985–86, 1986–87, 1987–88, 1988–89, 1989–90
Copa del Rey: 1988–89
Supercopa de España: 1988, 1989, 1990
UEFA Cup: 1985–86

Zaragoza
Copa del Rey: 1993–94
UEFA Cup Winners' Cup: 1994–95

Spain U21
UEFA European Under-21 Championship: 1986

References

External links

1964 births
Living people
People from Arnedo
Spanish footballers
Footballers from La Rioja (Spain)
Association football defenders
La Liga players
Segunda División players
Real Madrid Castilla footballers
Real Madrid CF players
Real Zaragoza players
UEFA Cup winning players
Spain youth international footballers
Spain under-21 international footballers
Spain under-23 international footballers
Spain international footballers
Spanish football managers
Segunda División B managers